Rabbi Yosef Yitzchak Shloush (Chelouche) (known to his community as "Rebbi Yosef")  (1890–1960) lived in the old city of Jerusalem until 1938.  In 1938, he moved to Machane Yehuda.  He was the head of the Chevrah Kadisha and the Av Bet Din of the Sephardic Community of Jerusalem. They used to say that he married off half of Jerusalem and buried the other half.  Rav Yosef Yitzchak ran a minyan in the old city of Jerusalem at a shul called Tzuv Dvash.

The Chevrah Kadisha on The Mount of Olives 
At one point Arabs were throwing stones at the chevra kadisha who were burying the dead on the Mount of Olives and they relayed this to Rebbi Yosef, who at that time was the head of the Chevrah Kadisha of the Sephardic Community in Jerusalem. Rebbi Yosef came up with an idea, he would go up with the chevra kadisha except he would be carried up like one of the dead. Once they were on the Mount of Olives and in the process of burying the dead, the Arabs started throwing stones, and the chevra kadisha ran away. But Rebbi Yosef was lying there, and once everyone was gone and the Arabs were there near him, he got up and in his long black robe and a staff, he ran after them, and surely the Arabs were scared and the chevra kadisha was allowed to continue burying their dead.

There was a book written about his life, published only a year later called "Hod Yosef". It was put together by the leaders of the community.

Family

Rabbi Yosef Yitzchak Shloush had a wife named Sa'ada and three children, Rav David Chaim Shloush the Chief Rabbi of Netanya, Rabbi Avraham Shloush the Chief Rabbi of Kfar Saba and Avigayil who is the Rabbanit or wife of Rav Ezran Z"L who was a Rosh Kollel in Jerusalem.

Rabbi Yosef Yitzchak Shloush’s father, Rav David Shloush ZT"L was a Rosh Yeshiva in Marrakech, Morocco.  He had a few children who had each died at the age of 2-3, and once again his baby, Yosef Yitzchak was two and was sick.  He went to the Aron Kodesh and prayed that this baby's life would be spared in turn for his own life.  Within two weeks, Rav David Shloush ZT"L died and the baby Yosef Yitzchak was saved.

Then Rav David Shloush ZT"L, also known as Hamelech David, came to his wife, Sultana in a dream and told her to go to Israel.  She did not pay attention to the dream, but the dream came to her two more times.  There is a tradition that if a dream happens three times it is serious, and thus she went to the Bet Din (Jewish Court) and told them that she had the dream three times and they told her that she must go to Israel as he had instructed, as it was a valid dream.  She still did not want to go to Israel, but once again Hamelech David  came to her in a dream and told her to go to Israel but she answered that she wanted to stay in Marrakech so that she could visit his grave. He told her to go to the grave of the Ohr Hachaim Hakadosh and to pray there. She waited for her children to grow a little older and when Yosef Yitzchak was twelve they travelled along with a big caravan to Israel.  When Hamelech David died, Yosef Yitzchak was two and Sultana, Hamelech David’s wife, was pregnant. Thus, Yosef Yitzchak had a younger sister who was two years younger, and they both travelled to Israel.

Once Hamelech David was leaving his synagogue along with one of his students.  Hamelech David told his student to go and check inside the synagogue before they leave, something which was not a usual routine.  His student checked and there was no one there.  They left and the synagogue collapsed.

See also 
 Tzuf Dvash Synagogue
 Maghrebim

References
 The Sephardic Community Committee of Jerusalem.  Hod Yosef. Jerusalem: Y. A. Itiah, 1961.
 yaaqovb. "גליון 13 פרשת שלח לך." Scribd. 7 Aug. 2009 https://www.scribd.com/doc/123470/-13->.
 Shloush, Rabbi David. Chemdah Genuzah 1. Jerusalem: Y. A. Itiah, 1976.

Sephardic Haredi rabbis in Israel
Haredi rabbis in Mandatory Palestine
People from Marrakesh
1890 births
1960 deaths
20th-century Moroccan rabbis
20th-century Israeli rabbis